Dneprov is a surname. Notable people with the surname include:

Anatoly Dneprov (writer) (1919–1975), Russian science fiction writer and physicist
Anatoly Dneprov (singer) (1947–2008), Russian singer, composer, and lyricist
Dneprov, a pen name of the Soviet politician Anatoly Lukyanov (1930–2019)